The 1994 Sacramento Gold Miners season was the second for the team in the Canadian Football League. The team finished in 5th place in the West Division with a 9–8–1 record and failed to make the playoffs.

Preseason 
Vs. Calgary L 39–24 (13,650) 
At Sask L 19–4 (26,850)

Regular season

Standings

Regular season
Vs. Las Vegas L 32–26 (14,816)
At Hamilton W 25–22 (19,291)
At Las Vegas W 22–20 (10,740)
Vs. Sask W 30–27 (14,828)
At BC L 46–10 (18,459)
At Calgary L 25–11 (21,110)
Vs. Edmonton L 44–15 (13,959)
At Winnipeg L 31–28 (21,804)
Vs. BC T 15–15 (12,633) 
At Baltimore W 30–29 (42,116)
Vs. Shreveport W 56–3 (13,741)
Vs. Calgary L 39–25 (17,192)
At Sask W 19–16 (23,669)
Vs. Toronto W 34–32 (13,050)
At Shreveport L 24–12 (12,465)
Vs. Ottawa W 44–9 (13,760)
At Edmonton L 22–16 (29,332)
Vs. Baltimore W 18–0 (14,056)

References

External links
 Sacramento Gold Miners team profile

Canadian Football League seasons
Sac
1994 in sports in California